Wijit Srisa-arn (born 22 December 1934) is a former Thai politician and was appointed Minister of Education in 2006 by a military junta following a successful military coup.  As Education Minister, he has cancelled several key Thai Rak Thai-government policies like Thailand's participation in the One Laptop Per Child program and plans to install broadband internet connections in all Thai schools.

Democrat MP
Wijit was a Democrat MP following the 2001 general election which the Thai Rak Thai party won in a landslide.  He became head of the Democrat Party’s committee on educational issues.

Minister of Education
On 19 September 2006, the Thai military overthrew the elected government in a coup.  The junta appointed Surayud Chulanont as Prime Minister and Wijit Srisa-arn as Education Minister.  Key policies Wijit enacted included:

 The cancellation of Thailand's participation in the One Laptop Per Child (OLPC) program.
 The cancellation of plans to install personal computers and broadband internet connections in every public and secondary school in Thailand.
 Forcing 430 prestigious schools across the country to accept half of their students from the local neighborhood.  All other schools would be required to accept all applicants; if applicants exceeded seats, a random draw would choose which applicants would be accepted.

Due to escalating violence in the South, all schools in Yala, Pattani, and Narathiwat provinces were shut down indefinitely from 27 November 2006.  Over 1,000 schools were closed.

See also
Surayud Chulanont
Thailand 2006 interim civilian government
Council for National Security

References

Living people
Wijit Srisa-arn
Wijit Srisa-arn
Wijit Srisa-arn
Wijit Srisa-arn
Wijit Srisa-arn
1934 births